The Indus   (Sanskrit: Sindhu) is a transboundary river of Asia and a trans-Himalayan river of South and Central Asia. The  river rises in mountain springs northeast of Mount Kailash in Western Tibet, flows northwest through the disputed region of Kashmir, bends sharply to the left after the Nanga Parbat massif, and flows south-by-southwest through Pakistan, before emptying into the Arabian Sea near the port city of Karachi.

The river has a total drainage area of circa . Its left-bank tributary in Ladakh is the Zanskar River, and its left-bank tributary in the plains is the Panjnad River which is formed by the successive confluences of the five Punjab rivers, namely the Chenab, Jhelum, Ravi, Beas, and Sutlej rivers. Its principal right-bank tributaries are the Shyok, Gilgit, Kabul, Kurram, and Gomal rivers. Beginning in a mountain spring and fed with glaciers and rivers in the Himalayan, Karakoram, and Hindu Kush ranges, the river supports the ecosystems of temperate forests, plains, and arid countryside.

The northern part of the Indus Valley, with its tributaries, forms the Punjab region of South Asia, while the lower course of the river ends in a large delta in the southern Sindh province of Pakistan. The river has historically been important to many cultures of the region. The 3rd millennium BCE saw the rise of Indus Valley Civilisation, a major urban civilization of the Bronze Age. During the 2nd millennium BCE, the Punjab region was mentioned in the Rigveda hymns as Sapta Sindhu and in the Avesta religious texts as Saptha Hindu (both terms meaning "seven rivers"). Early historical kingdoms that arose in the Indus Valley include Gandhāra, and the Ror dynasty of Sauvīra. The Indus River came into the knowledge of the Western world early in the classical period, when King Darius of Persia sent his Greek subject Scylax of Caryanda to explore the river, c. 515 BCE.

Etymology and names 
This river was known to the ancient Indians in Sanskrit as Sindhu and the Persians as Hindu which was regarded by both of them as "the border river". The variation between the two names is explained by the Old Iranian sound change *s > h, which occurred between 850 and 600 BCE according to Asko Parpola. From the Persian Achaemenid Empire, the name passed to the Greeks as Indós (Ἰνδός). It was adopted by the Romans as Indus. The name India is derived from Indus. The Indigenous peoples of the Americas are commonly called "Indians" or "Indios", a misnaming that dates to Christopher Columbus's erroneous belief that he had landed near India in 1492, when he actually landed in the Americas.

The Ladakhis and Tibetans call the river Senge Tsangpo (སེང་གེ་གཙང་པོ།), Baltis call it Gemtsuh and Tsuh-Fo, Pashtuns call it Nilab, Sher Darya and Abbasin, while Sindhis call it Mehran, Purali and Samundar. 

The modern name in Urdu and Hindi is Sindh, a semi-learned borrowing from Sanskrit.

Description

The Indus River provides key water resources for Pakistan's economy – especially the breadbasket of Punjab province, which accounts for most of the nation's agricultural production, and Sindh. The word Punjab means "land of five rivers" and the five rivers are Jhelum, Chenab, Ravi, Beas and Sutlej, all of which finally flow into the Indus. The Indus also supports many heavy industries and provides the main supply of potable water in Pakistan.

The total length of the river varies in different sources. Historically, the 1909 The Imperial Gazetteer of India gave it as "just over 1,800 miles". The modern Encyclopedia Britannica was originally published in 1999 with the shorter measurement, but was updated in 2015 to use the longer measurement. Both lengths are commonly found in modern publications; in some cases, both measurements can be found within the same work. An extended figure of circa  was announced by a Chinese research group in 2011, based on a comprehensive remeasurement from satellite imagery, and a ground expedition to identify an alternative source point, but detailed analysis has not yet been published.

The ultimate source of the Indus is in Tibet, but there is some debate about the exact source. The traditional source of the river is the Sênggê Kanbab (Sênggê Zangbo) or "Lion's Mouth", a perennial spring not far from the sacred Mount Kailash, marked by a long low line of Tibetan chortens. There are several other tributaries nearby, which may possibly form a longer stream than Sênggê Kanbab, but unlike the Sênggê Kanbab, are all dependent on snowmelt. The Zanskar River, which flows into the Indus in Ladakh, has a greater volume of water than the Indus itself before that point. An alternative reckoning begins the river around 300 km further upstream, at the confluence of the Sengge Zangbo and Gar Tsangpo rivers, which drain the Nganglong Kangri and Gangdise Shan (Gang Rinpoche, Mt. Kailash) mountain ranges. The 2011 remeasurement suggested the source was a small lake northeast of Mount Kailash, rather than either of the two points previously used.

The Indus then flows northwest through Ladakh (Indian-administered Kashmir) and Baltistan and Gilgit (Pakistan-administered Kashmir), just south of the Karakoram range. The Shyok, Shigar and Gilgit rivers carry glacial waters into the main river. It gradually bends to the south and descends into the Punjab plains at Kalabagh, Pakistan. It flows swiftly across Hazara and is dammed at the Tarbela Reservoir. The Kabul River joins it near Attock. The remainder of its route to the sea is in the plains of the Punjab and Sindh, where the flow of the river becomes slow and highly braided. It is joined by the Panjnad at Mithankot. Beyond this confluence, the river, at one time, was named the Satnad River (sat = "seven", nadī = "river"), as the river now carried the waters of the Kabul River, the Indus River and the five Punjab rivers. Passing by Jamshoro, it ends in a large delta to the South of Thatta in the Sindh province of Pakistan.

The Indus is one of the few rivers in the world to exhibit a tidal bore. The Indus system is largely fed by the snow and glaciers of the Himalayas, Karakoram and the Hindu Kush ranges. The flow of the river is also determined by the seasons – it diminishes greatly in the winter, while flooding its banks in the monsoon months from July to September. There is also evidence of a steady shift in the course of the river since prehistoric times – it deviated westwards from flowing into the Rann of Kutch and adjoining Banni grasslands after the 1816 earthquake. , Indus water flows in to the Rann of Kutch during its floods breaching flood banks.

History

The major cities of the Indus Valley Civilisation, such as Harappa and Mohenjo-daro, date back to around 3300 BCE, and represent some of the largest human habitations of the ancient world. The Indus Valley Civilisation extended from across northeast Afghanistan to Pakistan and northwest India, with an upward reach from east of Jhelum River to Ropar on the upper Sutlej. The coastal settlements extended from Sutkagan Dor at the Pakistan, Iran border to Kutch in modern Gujarat, India. There is an Indus site on the Amu Darya at Shortughai in northern Afghanistan, and the Indus site Alamgirpur at the Hindon River is located only  from Delhi. To date, over 1,052 cities and settlements have been found, mainly in the general region of the Ghaggar-Hakra River and its tributaries. Among the settlements were the major urban centres of Harappa and Mohenjo-daro, as well as Lothal, Dholavira, Ganeriwala, and Rakhigarhi. Only 40 Indus Valley sites have been discovered on the Indus and its tributaries. However, it is notable that majority of the Indus script seals and inscribed objects discovered were found at sites along the Indus river.

Most scholars believe that settlements of Gandhara grave culture of the early Indo-Aryans flourished in Gandhara from 1700 BCE to 600 BCE, when Mohenjo-daro and Harappa had already been abandoned.

The Rigveda describes several rivers, including one named "Sindhu". The Rigvedic "Sindhu" is thought to be the present-day Indus river. It is attested 176 times in its text, 94 times in the plural, and most often used in the generic sense of "river". In the Rigveda, notably in the later hymns, the meaning of the word is narrowed to refer to the Indus river in particular, e.g. in the list of rivers mentioned in the hymn of Nadistuti sukta. The Rigvedic hymns apply a feminine gender to all the rivers mentioned therein, except for the Brahmaputra.

The word "India" is derived from the Indus River. In ancient times, "India" initially referred to those regions immediately along the east bank of the Indus, where are Punjab and Sindh now  but by 300 BCE, Greek writers including Herodotus and Megasthenes were applying the term to the entire subcontinent that extends much farther eastward.

The lower basin of the Indus forms a natural boundary between the Iranian Plateau and the Indian subcontinent; this region embraces all or parts of the Pakistani provinces Balochistan, Khyber Pakhtunkhwa, Punjab and Sindh and the countries Afghanistan and India. The first West Eurasian empire to annex the Indus Valley was the Persian Empire, during the reign of Darius the Great. During his reign, the Greek explorer Scylax of Caryanda was commissioned to explore the course of the Indus. It was crossed by the invading armies of Alexander, but after his Macedonians conquered the west bank—joining it to the Hellenic world, they elected to retreat along the southern course of the river, ending Alexander's Asian campaign. Alexander's admiral Nearchus set out from the Indus Delta to explore the Persian Gulf, until reaching the Tigris River. The Indus Valley was later dominated by the Mauryan and Kushan Empires, Indo-Greek Kingdoms, Indo-Scythians and Hepthalites. Over several centuries Muslim armies of Muhammad ibn al-Qasim, Mahmud of Ghazni, Muhammad of Ghor, Timur and Babur crossed the river to invade Sindh and Punjab, providing a gateway to the Indian subcontinent.

Geography

Tributaries

Gar River
Gilgit River
Gomal River
Hunza River
Kabul River
Kunar River
Kurram River
Panjnad River
Chenab River
Jhelum River
Ravi River
Satluj River
Beas River
Shyok River
Soan River
Dras River (or Shingo River)
Swat River
Zanskar River
Luni river
Zhob River

Geology

Indus is an antecedent river, meaning that it existed before the Himalayas and entrenched itself while they were rising.

The Indus river feeds the Indus submarine fan, which is the second largest sediment body on the Earth. It consists of around 5 million cubic kilometres of material eroded from the mountains. Studies of the sediment in the modern river indicate that the Karakoram Mountains in northern Pakistan and India are the single most important source of material, with the Himalayas providing the next largest contribution, mostly via the large rivers of the Punjab (Jhelum, Ravi, Chenab, Beas and Sutlej). Analysis of sediments from the Arabian Sea has demonstrated that prior to five million years ago the Indus was not connected to these Punjab rivers which instead flowed east into the Ganga and were captured after that time. Earlier work showed that sand and silt from western Tibet was reaching the Arabian Sea by 45 million years ago, implying the existence of an ancient Indus River by that time. The delta of this proto-Indus river has subsequently been found in the Katawaz Basin, on the Afghan-Pakistan border.

In the Nanga Parbat region, the massive amounts of erosion due to the Indus river following the capture and rerouting through that area is thought to bring middle and lower crustal rocks to the surface.

In November 2011, satellite images showed that the Indus river had re-entered India, feeding Great Rann of Kutch, Little Rann of Kutch and a lake near Ahmedabad known as Nal Sarovar. Heavy rains had left the river basin along with the Lake Manchar, Lake Hemal and Kalri Lake (all in modern-day Pakistan) inundated. This happened two centuries after the Indus river shifted its course westwards following the 1819 Rann of Kutch earthquake.

The Induan Age at start of the Triassic Period of geological time is named for the Indus region.

Wildlife

Accounts of the Indus valley from the times of Alexander's campaign indicate a healthy forest cover in the region. The Mughal Emperor Babur writes of encountering rhinoceroses along its bank in his memoirs (the Baburnama). Extensive deforestation and human interference in the ecology of the Shivalik Hills has led to a marked deterioration in vegetation and growing conditions. The Indus valley regions are arid with poor vegetation. Agriculture is sustained largely due to irrigation works.
The Indus river and its watershed has a rich biodiversity. It is home to around 25 amphibian species.

Mammals
The Indus river dolphin (Platanista indicus minor) is found only in the Indus River. It is subspecies of the South Asian river dolphin. The Indus river dolphin formerly also occurred in the tributaries of the Indus river. According to the World Wildlife Fund it is one of the most threatened cetaceans with only about 1,816 still existing. It is threatened by habitat degradation from the construction of dams and canals, entanglement in fishing gear, and industrial water pollution.

There are two otter species in the Indus River basin: the Eurasian otter in the northeastern highland sections and the smooth-coated otter elsewhere in the river basin. The smooth-coated otters in the Indus River represent a subspecies found nowhere else, the Sindh otter (Lutrogale perspicillata sindica).

Fish
The Indus River basin has a high diversity, being the home of more than 180 freshwater fish species, including 22 which are found nowhere else. Fish also played a major role in earlier cultures of the region, including the ancient Indus Valley Civilisation where depictions of fish were frequent. The Indus script has a commonly used fish sign, which in its various forms may simply have meant "fish", or referred to stars or gods.

In the uppermost, highest part of the Indus River basin there are relatively few genera and species: Diptychus, Ptychobarbus, Schizopyge, Schizopygopsis and Schizothorax snowtrout, Triplophysa loaches, and the catfish Glyptosternon reticulatum. Going downstream these are soon joined by the golden mahseer Tor putitora (alternatively T. macrolepis, although it often is regarded as a synonym of T. putitora) and Schistura loaches. Downriver from around Thakot, Tarbela, the Kabul–Indus river confluence, Attock Khurd and Peshawar the diversity rises strongly, including many cyprinids (Amblypharyngodon, Aspidoparia, Barilius, Chela, Cirrhinus, Crossocheilus, Cyprinion, Danio, Devario, Esomus, Garra, Labeo, Naziritor, Osteobrama, Pethia, Puntius, Rasbora, Salmophasia, Securicula and  Systomus), true loaches (Botia and Lepidocephalus), stone loaches (Acanthocobitis and Nemacheilus), ailiid catfish (Clupisoma), bagridae catfish (Batasio, Mystus, Rita and Sperata), airsac catfish (Heteropneustes), schilbid catfish (Eutropiichthys), silurid catfish (Ompok and Wallago), sisorid catfish (Bagarius, Gagata, Glyptothorax and Sisor), gouramis (Trichogaster), nandid leaffish (Nandus), snakeheads (Channa), spiny eel (Macrognathus and Mastacembelus), knifefish (Notopterus), glassfish (Chanda and Parambassis), clupeids (Gudusia), needlefish (Xenentodon) and gobies (Glossogobius), as well as a few introduced species. As the altitude further declines the Indus basin becomes overall quite slow-flowing as it passes through the Punjab Plain. Major carp become common, and chameleonfish (Badis), mullet (Sicamugil) and swamp eel (Monopterus) appear. In some upland lakes and tributaries of the Punjab region snowtrout and mahseer are still common, but once the Indus basin reaches its lower plain the former group is entirely absent and the latter are rare. Many of the species of the middle sections of the Indus basin are also present in the lower. Notable examples of genera that are present in the lower plain but generally not elsewhere in the Indus River basin are the Aphanius pupfish, Aplocheilus killifish, palla fish (Tenualosa ilisha), catla (Labeo catla), rohu (Labeo rohita) and Cirrhinus mrigala. The lowermost part of the river and its delta are home to freshwater fish, but also a number of brackish and marine species. This includes pomfret and prawns. The large delta has been recognized by conservationists as an important ecological region. Here, the river turns into many marshes, streams and creeks and meets the sea at shallow levels.

Palla fish (Tenualosa ilisha) of the river is a delicacy for people living along the river. The population of fish in the river is moderately high, with Sukkur, Thatta, and Kotri being the major fishing centres – all in the lower Sindh course. As a result, damming and irrigation has made fish farming an important economic activity.

Economy

The Indus is the most important supplier of water resources to the Punjab and Sindh plains – it forms the backbone of agriculture and food production in Pakistan. The river is especially critical since rainfall is meagre in the lower Indus valley. Irrigation canals were first built by the people of the Indus Valley civilisation, and later by the engineers of the Kushan Empire and the Mughal Empire. Modern irrigation was introduced by the British East India Company in 1850 – the construction of modern canals accompanied with the restoration of old canals. The British supervised the construction of one of the most complex irrigation networks in the world.

After Pakistan came into existence, a water control treaty signed between India and Pakistan in 1960 guaranteed that Pakistan would receive water from the Indus River and its two tributaries the Jhelum River and the Chenab River independently of upstream control by India.

The Indus Basin Project consisted primarily of the construction of two main dams, the Mangla Dam built on the Jhelum River and the Tarbela Dam constructed on the Indus River, together with their subsidiary dams. The Pakistan Water and Power Development Authority undertook the construction of the Chashma-Jhelum link canal – linking the waters of the Indus and Jhelum rivers – extending water supplies to the regions of Bahawalpur and Multan. It supports the Chashma Barrage near Dera Ismail Khan for irrigation use and flood control and the Taunsa Barrage near Dera Ghazi Khan which also produces 100,000 kilowatts of electricity. The extensive linking of tributaries with the Indus has helped spread water resources to the valley of Peshawar, in the Khyber Pakhtunkhwa. The extensive irrigation and dam projects provide the basis for Pakistan's large production of crops such as cotton, sugarcane and wheat. The dams also generate electricity for heavy industries and urban centers.

People

The Indus river is sacred to Hindus. The Sindhu Darshan Festival is held on every Guru Purnima on the banks of the Indus.

The ethnicities of the Indus Valley (Pakistan and Northwest India) have a greater amount of ANI (or West Eurasian) admixture than other South Asians, including inputs from Western Steppe Herders, with evidence of more sustained and multi-layered migrations from the west.

Modern issues

Indus delta

Since the 1940s, dams, barrages and irrigation works have been constructed on the river. The Indus Basin Irrigation System is the "largest contiguous irrigation system developed over the past 140 years" anywhere in the world. As a result, the 2010 Pakistan floods were considered "good news" for the ecosystem and population of the river delta as they brought much needed fresh water. Any further utilization of the river basin water is not economically feasible.

Vegetation and wildlife of the Indus delta are threatened by the reduced inflow of fresh water, along with extensive deforestation, industrial pollution and global warming. Damming has also isolated the delta population of Indus river dolphins from those further upstream.

Large-scale diversion of the river's water for irrigation has raised far-reaching issues. Sediment clogging from poor maintenance of canals has affected agricultural production and vegetation on numerous occasions. Irrigation itself is increasing soil salinization, reducing crop yields and in some cases rendering farmland useless for cultivation.

Effects of climate change on the river
The Tibetan Plateau contains the world's third-largest store of ice. Qin Dahe, the former head of the China Meteorological Administration, said the recent fast pace of melting and warmer temperatures will be good for agriculture and tourism in the short term, but issued a strong warning:

Temperatures are rising four times faster than elsewhere in China, and the Tibetan glaciers are retreating at a higher speed than in any other part of the world... In the short term, this will cause lakes to expand and bring floods and mudflows.. In the long run, the glaciers are vital lifelines of the Indus River. Once they vanish, water supplies in Pakistan will be in peril.

"There is insufficient data to say what will happen to the Indus," says David Grey, the World Bank's senior water advisor in South Asia. "But we all have very nasty fears that the flows of the Indus could be severely, severely affected by glacier melt as a consequence of climate change," and reduced by perhaps as much as 50 percent. "Now what does that mean to a population that lives in a desert [where], without the river, there would be no life? I don't know the answer to that question," he says. "But we need to be concerned about that. Deeply, deeply concerned."

U.S. diplomat Richard Holbrooke said, shortly before his death in 2010, that he believed that falling water levels in the Indus River "could very well precipitate World War III."

Pollution
Over the years factories on the banks of the Indus River have increased levels of water pollution in the river and the atmosphere around it. High levels of pollutants in the river have led to the deaths of endangered Indus river dolphin. The Sindh Environmental Protection Agency has ordered polluting factories around the river to shut down under the Pakistan Environmental Protection Act, 1997. Death of the Indus river dolphin has also been attributed to fishermen using poison to kill fish and scooping them up. As a result, the government banned fishing from Guddu Barrage to Sukkur.

The Indus is second among a group of ten rivers responsible for about 90% of all the plastic that reaches the oceans. The Yangtze is the only river contributing more plastic.

2010 floods

Frequently, Indus river is prone to moderate to severe flooding. In July 2010, following abnormally heavy monsoon rains, the Indus River rose above its banks and started flooding. The rain continued for the next two months, devastating large areas of Pakistan. In Sindh, the Indus burst its banks near Sukkur on 8 August, submerging the village of Mor Khan Jatoi. In early August, the heaviest flooding moved southward along the Indus River from severely affected northern regions toward western Punjab, where at least  of cropland was destroyed, and the southern province of Sindh. , over two thousand people had died and over a million homes had been destroyed since the flooding began.

2011 floods

The 2011 Sindh floods began during the Pakistani monsoon season in mid-August 2011, resulting from heavy monsoon rains in Sindh, eastern Balochistan, and southern Punjab. The floods caused considerable damage; an estimated 434 civilians were killed, with 5.3 million people and 1,524,773 homes affected. Sindh is a fertile region and often called the "breadbasket" of the country; the damage and toll of the floods on the local agrarian economy was said to be extensive. At least  of arable land were inundated. The flooding followed the previous year's floods, which devastated a large part of the country. Unprecedented torrential monsoon rains caused severe flooding in 16 districts of Sindh.

Barrages, bridges, levees and dams

In Pakistan currently there are six barrages on the Indus: Guddu Barrage, Sukkur Barrage, Kotri Barrage (also called Ghulam Muhammad barrage), Taunsa Barrage, Chashma Barrage and Jinnah Barrage. Another new barrage called "Sindh Barrage" is planned as a terminal barrage on the Indus River. There are some bridges on river Indus, such as, Dadu Moro Bridge, Larkana Khairpur Indus River Bridge, Thatta-Sujawal bridge, Jhirk-Mula Katiar bridge and recently planned Kandhkot-Ghotki bridge.

The entire left bank of Indus river in Sind province is protected from river flooding by constructing around 600 km long levees. The right bank side is also leveed from Guddu barrage to Lake Manchar. In response to the levees construction, the river has been aggrading rapidly over the last 20 years leading to breaches upstream of barrages and inundation of large areas.

Tarbela Dam in Pakistan is constructed on the Indus River, while the controversial Kalabagh dam is also being constructed on Indus river.  Pakistan is also building Munda Dam.

Gallery

See also 

Baglihar Dam
Geology of the Himalayas
Ghaggar-Hakra River
HMS Indus
Indus River Delta
Indus Sagar Doab
Indus Valley Civilisation
Indus Waters Treaty
List of rivers of Pakistan
Rigvedic rivers
Rivers of Jammu and Kashmir
Sarasvati River
Sindhology
Sindhu Darshan Festival
Sindhu Pushkaram

Explanatory notes

Citations

General and cited references 
 Albinia, Alice. (2008) Empires of the Indus: The Story of a River. First American Edition (20101) W. W. Norton & Company, New York. .
 Alexander Burnes, A voyage on the Indus, London, 1973
 Philippe Fabry, Wandering with the Indus, with Yusuf Shahid (text) Lahore, 1995
 Jean Fairley, The Lion River: The Indus, London, 1975
 
 D. Murphy, Where the Indus is Young, London, 1977
 Samina Quraeshi, Legacy of the Indus, New York, 1974
 Schomberg, Between Oxus and Indus, London, 1935
 Francine Tissot, Les Arts anciens du Pakistan et de l'Afghanistan, Paris, 1987
 Sir M. Wheeler, Civilisations of the Indus Valley and Beyond, London, 1966
 World Atlas, Millennium Edition, p. 265.

External links

 The origins of Indus:
 
 
Northern Areas Development Gateway
 - covered parts of the Indus River
Indus River watershed map (World Resources Institute) 

 
 
History of Sindh
Indus Valley civilisation
International rivers of Asia
Rigvedic rivers
Rivers of China
Rivers of Gilgit-Baltistan
Rivers of India
Rivers of Jammu and Kashmir
Rivers of Pakistan
Rivers of Sindh
Rivers of Tibet
Sacred rivers
Rivers in Buddhism
Rivers of Khyber Pakhtunkhwa
Rivers of Punjab (Pakistan)